Mohammed Fannouna (born 3 April 1980) is a paralympic athlete from Palestine competing mainly in category T13  events.

After competing in the 2004 Summer Paralympics where he won a bronze in the long jump as well as competing in the javelin, Mohammed made an unsuccessful move to the track for the 2008 Summer Paralympics competing in the 100m and 200m but failing to medal in either.

References

Paralympic athletes of Palestine
Athletes (track and field) at the 2004 Summer Paralympics
Athletes (track and field) at the 2008 Summer Paralympics
Paralympic bronze medalists for Palestine
Living people
Athletes (track and field) at the 2012 Summer Paralympics
Place of birth missing (living people)
Medalists at the 2004 Summer Paralympics
1980 births
Paralympic medalists in athletics (track and field)
Palestinian male athletes
Male long jumpers
Visually impaired long jumpers
Paralympic long jumpers
Medalists at the 2010 Asian Para Games